John Reece (born March 1957) is a British billionaire businessman.

Early life
Reece was born in March 1957. He was educated at Bede School, Sunderland (now Sunderland College), and studied economics at Queens' College, Cambridge.

Career
In 2000, Reece, an accountant and partner at PricewaterhouseCoopers, joined the chemicals conglomerate Ineos, and is now the chief financial officer and minority shareholder.

In May 2021, Forbes estimated Reece's net worth to be $5.7 billion.

Personal life
Reece lives in Bougy-Villars, Switzerland.

References

1957 births
British billionaires
Living people
British expatriates in Switzerland
Alumni of Queens' College, Cambridge
British accountants
PricewaterhouseCoopers people
Ineos